Spadaro is an Italian surname.  This is an occupational surname for a professional soldier or, more specifically, a swordsman.

Notable people with the surname include:

 Antonio Spadaro (born 1966), Italian Jesuit priest
 Carlos Spadaro (19021985), Argentine football attacker
 Jack Spadaro (born 1948), American mining engineer
 Micco Spadaro, artistic name of Domenico Gargiulo (16091610  ca. 1675), Italian painter of the Baroque period
 Odoardo Spadaro (18931965), Italian singer-songwriter and actor
 Peppino Spadaro (18981950), Italian actor; brother of Umberto Spadaro
 Umberto Spadaro (19041981), Italian film actor; brother of Peppino Spadaro

Other 

 Spadaro Airport, privately owned, public use airport in Suffolk County, New York, United States 

Italian-language surnames